There was a Scottish National Party leadership election to choose the new Depute leader of the Scottish National Party at the SNP's conference on 14–15 October 2016. The SNP's Westminster Group Leader Angus Robertson MP won the election.

The election followed the resignation of the incumbent Depute Leader Stewart Hosie. Hosie, the partner of Scottish Government cabinet member Shona Robison, announced his intention to step down at the party conference in May 2016 after it emerged he was engaged in an affair with a freelance journalist, who had previously been involved in an affair with the SNP MP Angus MacNeil.

Campaigns
Four candidates took part in the election:
Angus Robertson MP
Alyn Smith MEP
Tommy Sheppard MP
Inverclyde Councillor Chris McEleny

Alyn Smith's campaign focused on the dual issues of strengthening Scotland's relationship with the European Union following the Brexit vote, and the need for a new Yes movement centred around the SNP.

Angus Robertson's campaign also focused on the issues of Brexit and the European Union, and particularly on preserving Scotland's place in Europe.

Chris McEleny's campaign focused on the importance of local government in light of the upcoming 2017 Scottish local elections.

Tommy Sheppard focused his campaign on revamping internal SNP policy making, with the intention of making policy decision making more open to the SNP party membership. Existing policy decisions are largely taken by the leadership, with minimal input from the SNP grassroots membership. He has been described as Robertson's "left-wing challenger".

Both McEleny and Sheppard are members of the SNP Socialists group, which said it was "challenging for leadership" of the SNP.

Other individuals suggested as potential candidates included Mhairi Black, Humza Yousaf, and Tasmina Ahmed-Sheikh. Humza Yousaf later ruled out running for the position, instead stating his support for Robertson.

Results

The election used the single transferable vote (STV) system.

Endorsements

Angus Robertson

Chris McEleny

References 
  

2016
2016 in Scotland
2010s elections in Scotland
2016 elections in the United Kingdom
Scottish National Party depute leadership election